Clash of the Titans (also known as Clash of the Titans: The Video Game) is a 2010 video game for the BlackBerry,  PlayStation 3 and Xbox 360 based on the film of the same title.

Gameplay
The game features hack and slash combat. Some of the fights end with quick time sequences. The player can use points to upgrade their weapons. In some sections of the game the player has their weapons removed and has to fight by hand. The player can perform both light and heavy attacks and can hold buttons to release special attacks. The player can wield swords, bones, bows, and scorpion tails. The enemies have health bars with colours to show how much health they have left.

Plot
The game's plot closely follows that of the movie.

Development
The game was developed by Game Republic and published by Namco Bandai Games. The game was originally going to be published by Brash Entertainment, before it was picked up by Namco Bandai.

Reception

The game received "unfavorable" reviews according to video game review aggregator Metacritic. The graphics, gameplay, story, menu systems, and level design were criticized. Nicky Woolf of The Guardian likened the level design of the Xbox version to "a four-year-old with only three different crayon colours" and labeled the quick-time event combat style therein as "annoying". Ben Reeves of Game Informer called the PS3 version a "frustrating action game with little depth". Dan Whitehead of Eurogamer described the combat as "relentless" but the game as a whole "barely succeeds on its own terms." IGN's Anthony Gallegos called the graphics "ugly as sin".

References

External links
 
 

2010 video games
Game Republic games
Bandai Namco games
BlackBerry games
Hack and slash games
Warner Bros. video games
PlayStation 3 games
Video games based on films
Windows games
Xbox 360 games
Video games developed in Japan
Video games set in antiquity
Video games based on Greek mythology
Clash of the Titans (film series)
Single-player video games
Glu Mobile games
HexaDrive games

ja:タイタンの戦い (2010年の映画)#ゲームソフト